In mathematics, a Fedosov manifold is a symplectic manifold with a compatible torsion-free connection, that is, a triple (M, ω, ∇), where (M, ω) is a symplectic manifold (that is,  is a symplectic form, a non-degenerate closed exterior 2-form, on a -manifold M), and ∇ is a symplectic torsion-free connection on  (A connection ∇ is called compatible or symplectic if X ⋅ ω(Y,Z) = ω(∇XY,Z) + ω(Y,∇XZ) for all vector fields X,Y,Z ∈ Γ(TM). In other words, the symplectic form is parallel with respect to the connection, i.e., its covariant derivative vanishes.) Note that every symplectic manifold admits a symplectic torsion-free connection. Cover the manifold with Darboux charts and on each chart define a connection ∇ with Christoffel symbol .  Then choose a partition of unity (subordinate to the cover) and glue the local connections together to a global connection which still preserves the symplectic form. The famous result of Boris Vasilievich Fedosov gives a canonical deformation quantization of a Fedosov manifold.

Examples 

For example,  with the standard symplectic form  has the symplectic connection given by the exterior derivative  Hence,  is a Fedosov manifold.

References 

 Symplectic Connections Induced by the Chern Connection

Mathematical physics